Daniel Brooks (born 23 June 1958) is a Canadian theatre director, actor and playwright.  He is well known in the Toronto theatre scene for his innovative productions and script-writing collaborations.

Early life
Brooks was born in Toronto, Ontario. He graduated from the drama program at University College.

Career

Brooks has collaborated in the creation of several solo shows by Daniel MacIvor, including House, Here Lies Henry, The Lorca Play and Monster.

He has also collaborated with John Mighton, Don McKellar, Rick Miller (comedian), Bruce McDonald (director), Diego Matamoros, Tracy Wright and the Leslie Spit Treeo.

He worked with Guillermo Verdecchia to develop The Noam Chomsky Lectures and Insomnia. In 2001, Brooks was the recipient of the inaugural Siminovitch Prize in Theatre.

In 2007, Brooks wrote a play called The Eco Show. In 2011 he worked with Michael Ondaatje to create a play based on Ondaatje's novel Divisadero.

A further collaboration with MacIvor, Who Killed Spalding Gray?, premiered in 2014 at the Magnetic North Theatre Festival in Halifax, Nova Scotia.

He collaborated with fellow Siminovitch Prize-winner Kim Collier on two separate works in 2018–19.

Classics

Brooks played the lead in a 1981 production of Hamlet directed by Ken Gass.  Brooks directed Goethe's Faust for the Tarragon Theatre in 1999 and Oedipus Rex at Stratford Festival in 2015.

In 2016, Brooks staged a version of Henrik Ibsen's play A Doll House, adapted to a modern setting. For Soulpepper he directed Samuel Beckett's Endgame (play) in 1999 and Waiting for Godot in 2017.

Companies

Brooks was formerly co-director of the Augusta Company; co-director of the da da kamera company; playwright-in-residence at the Tarragon Theatre; and director of the Necessary Angel company from 2003 to 2012.

Awards and recognition

Brooks has won the following awards:

the Chalmers Award; the Dora Mavor Moore Award (three times); the Pauline McGibbon Award; the Edinburgh Fringe First Award; the Capital Critics Circle Award; and the inaugural Elinore and Lou Siminovitch Prize in Theatre.

He was also nominated for a Governor General's Award.

References

Daniel Brooks: The Canadian Theatre Encyclopedia

1958 births
Living people
Canadian theatre directors
20th-century Canadian dramatists and playwrights
21st-century Canadian dramatists and playwrights
Canadian male stage actors
Canadian male dramatists and playwrights
20th-century Canadian male writers
21st-century Canadian male writers
Writers from Toronto